Jonathan Child House & Brewster–Burke House Historic District is a national historic district containing a set of two historic homes located at Rochester in Monroe County, New York.

The Jonathan Child House, located at 37 S. Washington St. was constructed 1837-1838 by Jonathan Child (1785–1860), Rochester's first mayor and son-in-law of the city's founder Nathaniel Rochester. It features a monumental two story portico and is a fine example of the Greek Revival style.  The building has seen a number of uses since Child sold it in the 1840s, including once as a boarding house called The Pillars.  As of Fall 2012, the building is slated to open as Rochester Pillars, a special-events venue.

The Brewster-Burke House, located at 130 Spring St., is a fine example of the Italianate style. The house features a hipped roof with cupola and an entrance porch with carved Moorish Revival ornamentation.

It was listed on the National Register of Historic Places in 1971.

Images

See also
National Register of Historic Places listings in Rochester, New York

References

External links

Landmark Society of Western New York, Jonathan Child House tour
Monroe County (NY) Library System - Rochester Images - Jonathan Child House
The Brewster-Burke House, 130 Spring Street, history

Images of the Jonathan Child House on New York Heritage

Houses on the National Register of Historic Places in New York (state)
Historic American Buildings Survey in New York (state)
Historic districts in Rochester, New York
Greek Revival houses in New York (state)
Italianate architecture in New York (state)
Houses completed in 1838
Moorish Revival architecture in New York (state)
Houses in Monroe County, New York
Historic districts on the National Register of Historic Places in New York (state)
National Register of Historic Places in Rochester, New York